Zambia competed at the 2020 Summer Olympics in Tokyo. Originally scheduled to take place from 24 July to 9 August 2020, the Games were postponed to 23 July to 8 August 2021, due to the COVID-19 pandemic. It was the nation's fourteenth appearance at the Summer Olympics, although it marked its official debut in 1964 under the name Northern Rhodesia.

Competitors
The following is the list of number of competitors in the Games. Note that reserves in football are not counted:

Athletics

Zambian athletes achieved the entry standards, either by qualifying time or by world ranking, in the following track and field events (up to a maximum of 3 athletes in each event):

Track & road events

Boxing 

Zambia entered three male boxers into the Olympic tournament. Patrick Chinyemba (men's flyweight), Everisto Mulenga (men's featherweight), and Stephen Zimba (men's welterweight) secured the spots on the Zambian squad by advancing to the final match of their respective weight divisions at the 2020 African Qualification Tournament in Diamniadio, Senegal.

Football

Summary

Women's tournament

Zambia women's football team qualified for the first time at the Olympics by winning the fifth and final round against Cameroon at the 2020 CAF Olympic Qualifying Tournament.

Team roster

Group play

Judo
 
Zambia qualified one judoka for the men's half-lightweight category (66 kg) at the Games. Steven Mungandu accepted a continental berth from Africa as the nation's top-ranked judoka outside of direct qualifying position in the IJF World Ranking List of June 28, 2021.

Swimming

Zambia received a universality invitation from FINA to send two top-ranked swimmers (one per gender) in their respective individual events to the Olympics, based on the FINA Points System of June 28, 2021.

References

Nations at the 2020 Summer Olympics
2020
2021 in Zambian sport